Fusiturris is a genus of sea snails, marine gastropod mollusks in the family Fusiturridae.

This genus was before 2018 included in the Clavatulidae.

Species
Species within the genus Fusiturris include:
 Fusiturris amianta (Dautzenberg, 1912)
 † Fusiturris aquensis (Grateloup, 1832) 
 † Fusiturris duchasteli flexiplicata (Kautsky, 1925) 
 † Fusiturris geneifae Abbass H., 1977 
 Fusiturris pfefferi (Strebel, 1912)
 Fusiturris pluteata (Reeve, 1843)
 † Fusiturris porrecta (Wood, 1848) 
 Fusiturris similis (Bivona, 1838)
 Fusiturris torta (Dautzenberg, 1912)
 Fusiturris undatiruga (Bivona Ant. in Bivona And., 1838)
Species brought into synonymy
 Fusiturris kribiensis Bozzetti, 2015: synonym of Tomellana hupferi var. fusca (Strebel, 1912) accepted as Tomellana hupferi (Strebel, 1912)

References

 Thiele, J. (1929-1935). Handbuch der systematischen Weichtierkunde. Jena, Gustav Fischer, 1154 pp. Vol. 1 part 1: 1-376 [between 4 September and 21 October 1929]; Vol. 1 part 2: 377-778 [before 31 October 1931]; Vol. 2 part 3: 779-1022 [before 19 January 1934]; Vol. 2 part 4: i-iv, 1023–1154, i-vi for volume 1

External links
 
 Abdelkrim J., Aznar-Cormano L., Fedosov A., Kantor Y., Lozouet P., Phuong M., Zaharias P. & Puillandre N. (2018). Exon-capture based phylogeny and diversification of the venomous gastropods (Neogastropoda, Conoidea). Molecular Biology and Evolution. 35(10): 2355-2374

 
Gastropod genera